Bashahrul Abu Bakar (born 6 April 1990 in Kedah) is a Malaysian footballer formerly playing for Sime Darby F.C. in Malaysia Premier League.

External links
 

1990 births
Living people
People from Kedah
Malaysian footballers
Malaysian people of Malay descent
Malaysia international footballers
Kedah Darul Aman F.C. players
Sime Darby F.C. players
Association football central defenders